Kevin Chapman (born July 29, 1962) is an American actor known for playing an assortment of characters ranging from the obnoxious brother Terrence Garrity in FX's Rescue Me to street enforcer Val Savage in Clint Eastwood's Mystic River and Sunshine Cleaning (2008). He also portrayed Detective Lionel Fusco on the CBS crime drama Person of Interest, Freddie Cork on Brotherhood (2006-2008), and guest starred in 24 (2002-2003).

Career
Prior to acting, he had worked as a doorman and a stand-up comedian. While working at the Boston Office of Cultural Affairs, Chapman was discovered by the late director, Ted Demme, and was cast as Mickey Pat in Monument Ave. (1998). Other notable film roles of his include The Cider House Rules, Mystic River, 21 Grams, In Good Company, an Italian mobster in The Boondock Saints (1999), and Fire Lt. Frank McKinney in Ladder 49 (2004). Chapman starred as Irish Mob boss, Freddie Cork, for three seasons in the Showtime original series Brotherhood. Chapman played a first responder assisting Jack Bauer (Kiefer Sutherland) in season 1 episode 24 of the TV series 24 (2001) and Kevin Mitchell in season 3 of 24 (2003). He also played a CIA operative (O'Leary) in the independent comedy Black Dynamite.

In 2006, Chapman appeared as an officer in the episode "Lessons Learned" (Season 2, Episode 10) of Criminal Minds. In 2010, he played Bunny in Tony Scott's action film Unstoppable. He also was a guest star in the series Lost. He appears in the film Bad Country (2013), directed by Chris Brinker. From 2011 to 2016, he portrayed Detective Lionel Fusco on the CBS show Person of Interest.

Personal life
Chapman is married to Meaghan E. Kennedy, and they have two children.

Filmography

Film

Television

References

External links
 
 

American male film actors
American male television actors
People from Hingham, Massachusetts
Living people
1962 births